Just Broke Up (/Molis horisa) is a 2008 Greek comedy film directed by Vassilis Myrianthopoulos, starring Zeta Makripoulia and Giannis Tsimitselis. The film was one of the highest grossing Greek films in this season.

Plot
The theme of the film is the break-up of a couple, namely Ilektra (Zeta Makripoulia) and Petros (Giannis Tsimitselis) on the former's birthday in modern-day Athens in Greece. The break-up occurs by Petros leaving a message on Ilektra's answering machine asking her to break up with him. The message is overheard by Ilektra's friends who are currently in her apartment preparing a surprise birthday party for her. They decide to hide the truth from her until after the party. What follows is a series of misunderstandings between Ilektra and her friends: Mary, Dimitris (Mary's boyfriend),Lou, Mitsos and her mother. The situation is further perplexed by Vittor, a Spaniard and Lou's chance acquaintance, an uninvited tapperwoman, Titika Karlatira, and a pizza-boy.

Cast
 Zeta Makripoulia
 Giannis Tsimitselis
 Elisavet Konstadinidou
 Maria Lekaki
 Giorgos Karamixos
 Anna Monogiou
 Iosif Poloyidis
 Sissi Christidou
 Maria Bakodimou
 Kimon Fioretos
 Tommy Slavos

External links

 Official Website: 

Greek comedy films
2008 films
2000s Greek-language films